The 2015–16 Champions Hockey League was the second season of the Champions Hockey League, a European ice hockey tournament launched by 26 founding clubs, six leagues and the International Ice Hockey Federation (IIHF).

The regulation round began on 20 August 2015 and ended on 6 September 2015. The playoffs began on 22 September 2015 and ended with the Champions Hockey League Final on 9 February 2016. Frölunda HC defeated Kärpät 2–1 to win the second edition of Champions Hockey League.

Team allocation 
A total of 48 teams from twelve different European first-tier leagues participate in the 2015–16 Champions Hockey League.

Team license 
The teams were decided with regards to different licenses for the founding teams, leagues and wildcards.

 A license: The 26 founding teams get an A license, if they play in the first-tier league of their respective domestic league system in the 2015–16 season.
 B license: Two teams – the regular-season winner and the play-off champion in the 2014–15 season – from each of the founding leagues (the Austrian EBEL, the Czech Extraliga, the Finnish Liiga, the German DEL, the Swedish SHL and the Swiss NLA) received a B licence to the tournament. If those teams had already received an A license, other teams from the league took the B license spots. The order the B licenses were handed out is:
 National champion
 Regular season winner
 Runner-up, regular season
 Play-off finalist
 Best placed semifinal loser
 Worst placed semifinal loser

 C license: There were 10 wild cards. The champions from Norway, Denmark, Slovakia, France and the United Kingdom—like the previous season—got wild cards. From Slovakia, France, Norway and the United Kingdom, a second team also got a wild card. One wild card license were assigned to the 2014–15 IIHF Continental Cup winner HK Neman Grodno.

Teams

Round and draw dates
The schedule of the competition is as follows.

Group stage 

For the 2015–16 season, the regular season was expanded to 48 teams, divided into 16 groups with 3 teams in each group. The two first teams in each group advanced to the play-offs (round of 32).

The group stage began on 20 August and ended on 6 September 2015. The 48 teams were divided into 16 groups of three teams each. Each team played a double round-robin in their group, facing each team at home and on the road, giving 4 games per team. The 16 group winners and the 16 runners-up qualified for the playoffs.

Group stage draw 
The 16 groups were determined by a draw taking place on 13 May 2015 in Prague, Czech Republic. The 48 teams had been ranked and placed into three pots of 16 teams each. Following the draw, each group consisted of one team from each pot. The seedings were as follows;

Tiebreakers 

The teams were ranked according to points (3 points for a win in regular time, 2 points for an overtime win or shootout win, 1 point for an overtime loss or shootout loss, 0 points for a loss in regular time). If two or more teams were equal on points on completion of the group matches, the following criteria were applied in the order given to determine the rankings:
higher number of points obtained in the group matches played among the teams in question;
superior goal difference from the group matches played among the teams in question;
higher number of goals scored in the group matches played among the teams in question;
higher number of wins in regular time in the group matches played among the teams in question;
higher number of goals scored in one match in the group matches played among the teams in question;
if, after having applied criteria 1 to 5, teams still had an equal ranking in a two-way tie, criteria 1 to 5 were reapplied against the third team in the group. If this procedure did not lead to a decision, criteria 7 to 10 applied;
higher number of wins in overtime;
higher number of goals scored in shootout (if both matches ended in shootout);
if two teams still remained tied and they met in their group's final game, they played a shootout to determine which team is ranked higher;
higher pre-draw rankings.

Group A

Group B

Group C

Group D

Group E

Group F

Group G

Group H

Group I

Group J

Group K

Group L

Group M

Group N

Group O

Group P

Playoffs 
In the playoffs, the teams played against each other over two legs on a home-and-away basis with the team with the better standing after the group stage having the second game at home, except for the one-game final played at the venue of the team with the best competition track record leading up to the final.

The mechanism of the draw for playoffs were as follows:
The entire playoff was drawn at a single occasion on 8 September 2015 to determine the sixteen pairings for the Round of 32. After the draw, all games up to the final were set in brackets.
In the draw for the Round of 32, the 16 group winners were seeded, and the 16 runners-up were unseeded. The seeded teams were drawn against the unseeded teams, with the seeded teams hosting the second leg. Teams from the same group could not be drawn against each other.

Playoff teams

Bracket 

Note:
The teams listed on top of each tie play first game at home and the bottom team plays second game at home.
The order of the legs (what team starts at home) in the future rounds may be changed as the team with best record should have second game at home.

Round of 32 
The draw for the entire playoff (round of 32, round of 16, quarter-finals, semi-finals and final) was held on 8 September 2015. The first legs were played on 22 and 29 September, and the second legs were played on 6 October 2015. The seeded teams (group winners) played the last game at home.

|}

Round of 16 
The first legs were played on 3 November, and the second legs were played on 10 November 2015.

|}

Quarter-finals 
The first legs were played on 1 December, and the second legs were played on 8 December 2015.

|}

Semi-finals 
The first legs were played on 12 January, and the second legs were played on 19 January 2016.

|}

Notes

Final 

The final was played on 9 February 2016.

References 

 
Champions Hockey League seasons
1